Pierce Atwood LLP is a law firm based in New England. It is one of the largest in northern New New England. The firm has offices in Portland and Augusta, Maine; Portsmouth, New Hampshire; Boston, Massachusetts; Providence, Rhode Island, and Washington, DC. It is named in part for Edward W. Atwood, a state legislator and lobbyist. It has approximately 150 attorneys on staff.

It was formerly known as Pierce, Atwood, Scribner, Allen, Smith & Lancaster.

Notable people
 Jane Amero
 John Formella
 William J. Kayatta Jr.
 Nikolas P. Kerest
 Vincent L. McKusick
 Fred C. Scribner Jr.
 Daniel Wathen

References

Law firms based in Maine